"Verbum supernum prodiens" (literally: The word [descending] from above) is a Catholic hymn in long metre by St Thomas Aquinas (1225–1274). It was written for the Hour of Lauds in the Divine Office of Corpus Christi. It is about the institution of the Eucharist by Christ at the Last Supper, and His Passion and death.

The last two verses form a hymn on their own as well, O salutaris hostia, which is sung at the adoration of the Blessed Sacrament.

There is also an unrelated Latin Nativity hymn of the same name.

Latin text and English translation

See also
 Adoro te devote 
 Lauda Sion 
 O salutaris hostia
 Pange lingua 
 Sacris solemniis
 Veni creator spiritus
 Saint Mass

References

External links

  in the Catholic Encyclopedia discusses the two hymns of the same name.

Eucharist in the Catholic Church
13th-century poems
Latin-language Christian hymns
13th-century Latin literature
Medieval literature
Hymns by Thomas Aquinas